Nain may refer to:

Places
 Nain, Iran, a city in Iran
 Nain County, an administrative subdivision of Iran
 Nain, Israel, a village in Galilee, mentioned in the New Testament (miraculous raising of the son of the widow of Nain)
 Nain, Jamaica, a village in the parish of Saint Elizabeth
 Nain, Newfoundland and Labrador, a village on the central coast of Labrador, Canada
 Nain Province, a geologic province in Labrador, Canada, part of the North Atlantic Craton
 Nain, Punjab, a village and Union Council of Pakistan
 Nain, South Australia, in the northern Barossa Valley
 Nain, Virginia, an unincorporated community in Frederick County, Virginia, United States
 Nain, Principality of Hutt River, capital and only town in the self-proclaimed state
 Nain, Raebareli, a village in Uttar Pradesh, India

Other uses
 Nain rug, name of a traditional pattern and design of Persian carpet
 North American Interfaith Network
 Nain, assistant court ladies of Korea, see gungnyeo

See also 
 Nain Jaune, a traditional, still popular French family card game